The 1907 Oklahoma Sooners football team represented the University of Oklahoma as an independent during the 1907 college football season. In their third year under head coach Bennie Owen, the Sooners compiled a 4–4 record, and outscored their opponents by a combined total of 181 to 95. Statehood came to Oklahoma on November 16.

Schedule

Roster

References

Oklahoma
Oklahoma Sooners football seasons
Oklahoma Sooners football
Oklahoma Sooners football